The 2013–14 Campbell Fighting Camels basketball team represented Campbell University during the 2013–14 NCAA Division I men's basketball season. The Fighting Camels were led by new head coach Kevin McGeehan and played their home games at Gore Arena. They were members of the North Division of the Big South Conference. They finished the season 12–20, 6–10 in Big South play to finish in fourth place in the North Division. They lost in the first round of the Big South tournament to Charleston Southern.

Roster

Schedule

|-
!colspan=9 style="background:#FF7F00; color:#000000;"| Regular season

|-
!colspan=9 style="background:#FF7F00; color:#000000;"| Big South tournament

References

Campbell Fighting Camels basketball seasons
Campbell
Camp
Camp